Raqqa District is a district of the Raqqa Governorate in northern Syria. The administrative centre is the city of Raqqa. At the 2004 census, the district had a population of 503,960.

Sub-districts
The district of Raqqa is divided into four subdistricts or nawāḥī (population as of 2004):
Raqqa Subdistrict (ناحية الرقّة): population 338,773.
Al-Sabkhah Subdistrict (ناحية السبخة): population 48,106
Al-Karamah Subdistrict (ناحية الكرامة): population 74,429.
Maadan Subdistrict (ناحية معدان): population 42,652.

References

 
Districts of Raqqa Governorate